Yalecrest is an affluent residential neighborhood located on the East Bench of Salt Lake City and is known for the architectural variety and rare collection of turn-of-the-century homes – all within a six block radius bordered by the South Side of Sunnyside Avenue, North Side of 1300 South, East Side of 1300 East and West Side of 1900 East.  Yalecrest is commonly referred to as the "Harvard-Yale area" and several streets are named after Ivy League universities.  It is a remarkably visually cohesive area with uniform setbacks, historic houses of the same era with comparable massing and landscaping, as well as streets lined with mature shade trees, and a surprising level of contributing structures that retain their historic integrity.  Yalecrest contains 1,487 homes that were built in the early 20th century starting as early as 1912 with the vast majority (74%) built during the period of 1920–1940.  The remaining homes in the easternmost part of the neighborhood were built during the post war boom.  Yalecrest has the largest concentration of period revival English Cottages, English Tudors, French Norman and Spanish Colonial homes anywhere in Utah.  These houses exhibit a variety of period revival styles with the largest portion being English Tudor and English Cottage.  According to the Salt Lake City Planning Department, the architectural variety and concentration of period cottages found in Yalecrest are "unrivalled in the state." Examples from Yalecrest are used to illustrate period revival cottages styles in the only statewide architectural style manual.  There are 22 subdivisions which were platted and built by the prominent architects and developers of the day responsible for early 20th Century east side Salt Lake City development. .  Yalecrest has been on the National Register of Historic Places since November 8, 2007. One home in the neighborhood, the George Albert Smith home at 1302 Yale Avenue, is listed on the National Register since 1993.

The first home built in Yalecrest was at 882 South 1400 East in 1912.  In those days, Yalecrest was an unsettled area perched against a beautiful rolling hillside that gradually rose in elevation to 4,000 feet above sea level.  To the East are panoramic views of the towering Wasatch Mountains, to the West are sweeping vistas that encompass Salt Lake's broad Valley, Utah's West Desert and the Oquirrh Mountains as well as downtown Salt Lake City.  A tributary of Red Butte Creek meanders gently through the northwest quadrant creating a shaded gully that has since become a popular park with two mini-amphitheaters.  The area also encompasses three churches belonging to the Church of Jesus Christ of Latter-day Saints (LDS Church), three commercial buildings, one school and two parks.   In its early years and in subsequent periods, Yalecrest has been a haven for the well-to-do along with prominent professionals, business executives, church leaders, writers and those in the arts and sciences

Early history
The property that is now Yalecrest was distributed by the LDS church authorities by lot for use in raising crops and farming. Dividing the plots for land speculation was discouraged.  The earliest identified residents in the Yalecrest area begin to appear in the 1870s.  A ten-acre plot belonging to Gutliffe Beck was located near Yalecrest between 1700 and 1800 East.  His early 1870s adobe farmstead was located near the intersection of Yalecrest Avenue and 1700 East.  The property was later used as a dairy farm.  Paul Schettler's farm, situated near the intersection of 1900 East and Herbert Avenue had crops that included silk worms and mulberry orchards.  David Lawrence had twenty acres of alfalfa located to the south of the Schettlers.  On Sunnyside between 1800 and 1900 East, Jim Carrigan built a house c. 1876 and farmed forty-five acres.  A one-legged man named Wheeler lived at what is now 1372 Harvard and got his culinary water from Red Butte Creek.  No remnants of these early homes are known to remain.

A number of factors contributed to the Yalecrest area development in the early twentieth century.  The population of Salt Lake City increased rapidly at the turn of the century, almost doubling from 1900 to 1910.  Air pollution from coal-burning furnaces as well as early industry in the valley added to the smoke-filled air of Salt Lake City, particularly in the winter.  Properties on the east bench above the steep grade that flattens at 1300 East above the smoky air of the city began to look attractive for residential development.  Land developers from Utah and out-of-state sensed economic opportunity in the potential urban growth, began to purchase land on the east bench and early subdivision advertising touted the clean air of the bench, above the smoke of the valley. Transportation options made the Yalecrest area easily accessible to the downtown area. The primary means of transportation in the early part of this era was the streetcar and the line along 1500 East serviced Yalecrest commuters to downtown Salt Lake City. The streetcars serving the Yalecrest area traveled from downtown to 1300 East in front of East High, south along 900 South to 1500 East, then south to Sugar House and the prison.

Notable residents
 Charles R. Mabey - Utah House of Representatives 1913 - 1915, 5th Governor of Utah 1921-1925
 William C. Ray - Democratic Candidate for the U.S. House of Representatives 1912, U.S. District Attorney
 Gaskell Romney - Builder/Contractor, Regarded as the Father of The Romney U.S. Political Family, Mitt Romney's Grandfather
 Wallace F. Bennett - U.S. Senator from Utah 1950 - 1974
 George Albert Smith - LDS General Authority - 8th Church President May, 1945
 Ezra Taft Benson - U.S. Secretary of Agriculture during Dwight D. Eisenhower Administration, LDS General Authority, and 13th       Church President 1985
 Spencer W. Kimball - LDS General Authority - 12th Church President 1974
 Hugh B. Brown - LDS General Authority Apostle of the Quorum of the Twelve 1970 - 1975
 Russell M. Nelson - LDS General Authority Apostle of the Quorum of the Twelve 1984 - Current
 Joseph B. Wirthlin - LDS General Authority Apostle of the Quorum of the Twelve 1986 - 2008
 Dallin H. Oaks - Professor at the University of Chicago Law School, President of Brigham Young University, Utah Supreme Court Justice, LDS General Authority Apostle of the Quorum of the Twelve 1984 - Current
 Michael O. Leavitt (Mike Leavitt) - 14th Governor of Utah,  Administrator of the Environmental Protection Agency 2003 - 2005, Secretary of Health and Human Services 2005 - 2009
 Ty Burrell -  Emmy Award Winning Actor Modern Family  ABC Network

Prominent architects
 J.C. Craig – House at 1327 E. Michigan Avenue
 Lorenzo Snow Young – Bonneville LDS Ward, House at 1608 E. Michigan
 Glen A. Finlayson – Unusual Art Deco House at 973 Diestel Road
 Slack Winburn – House at 979 South 1300 East – He studied architecture in Toulouse France at The Ecole des Beaux Arts et des Sciences Industrielles
 Fred J. Swaner – House at 871 South 1400 East
 Dan Weggeland – Normandie Heights - 1300 East (E)- 1500 East (W) includes the streets of Harvard, Princeton, Laird, Normandie Circle, Laird Circle and Uintah Circle
 Raymond Ashton – George Albert Smith House at 1302 Yale, Sprague Library
 Walter E. Ware – House at 1607 E. Yalecrest for Charles and Minnie Miller
 Taylor Woolley – Frank Lloyd Wright trained architect and protégé– 1402 Yale Avenue

Churches
 Yale Ward - Colonial Revival chapel designed by Taylor Woolley (a Frank Lloyd Wright trained architect) at Evans and Woolley and built by Gaskell Romney in 1925.  Both Woolley and Romney were nearby residents.
 Yalecrest Ward - Art Deco and Moorish Revival chapel at 1035 South 1800 East, completed in 1936.
 Garden Park Ward - Famed early Modern chapel with elements of Tudor Revival and surrounding Moorish gardens. Completed in 1939.
 Bonneville Ward - Postwar Colonial Revival style chapel designed by Lorenzo Snow Young and constructed by the Jacobsen Construction Company in 1949. Built on land previously incorporated into the park, the road now standing between them was originally a private drive owned by the LDS Church.

Parks
 Miller Park - Miller Park follows the course of Red Butte Creek on both sides of its ravine and was originally a 9-acre ravine that extended from 900 South to 1500 East but now stops at Bonneview Drive as a land swap in 1945 gave the southern section of Miller Park to the LDS Church in exchange for property that became Laird Park, located on 1800 East between Laird and Princeton.  Miller Park is named for Lee Charles and Minnie Viele Miller that lived at 1607 Yalecrest.  After Lee Charles death in 1930 Minnie Miller donated 2 acres of property in his memory along both sides of Red Butte Creek to the city and along with city property and property acquired from the Herrick Construction Company and became known as the Lee Charles Miller Park.
 Laird Park - Laird Park is located on 1800 East between Laird and Princeton Avenue was created in 1945.

Commercial buildings
 Duffin's Grocery Store - Duffin's Grocery Store was built in 1925 at 1604 Princeton and was run by Clarence Duffin in conjunction with William Wood & Sons meat market.  Duffin's was the only market within Yalecrest and designed to have the same setback and blend in with the surrounding houses. Duffin's Grocery was renamed Princeton Market before being turned into a hair salon "Princeton Hair Fashions". This property has now been turned into a personal residence but retains its historic charm.
 Currently there are 3 commercial buildings in Yalecrest.  At 1700 East and 1300 South is a restaurant called Sea Salt that shares the building with a retail clothing boutique and spa.  Another restaurant located near it is "Eggs in the City". There is a small coffee shop, Java Joe's, located at 1300 East and 900 South.

Schools
 Uintah Elementary School was constructed in 1915 to support the growing elementary school age population of the East Bench.  It was built encircled by vacant land but was soon filled to capacity with the rapid growth of the surrounding residential sections. The school was enlarged in 1927 and in 1995 the original school was torn down and a new one built in its place.

Preservation
There is no current zoning protection in place for the Yalecrest Neighborhood.  National Register status does not prohibit demolitions or out of character remodels.  According to the 2007 National Register of Historic Places designation (based on a 2005 survey), 91% of the neighborhood's 1,487 structures have been identified as significantly contributing to the historic district.  However, the neighborhood is experiencing a teardown rate of up to 6 houses per year.  Starting in 2010 the neighborhood is experiencing escalated rates of teardowns primarily from developers wanting to capitalize on the location and beauty of the district.   The teardowns and overscaled rebuilds and additions discourage neighbors and create animosity on the block.  According to the Utah Heritage Foundation, Yalecrest has the largest number of demolitions of any area in the State of Utah since the early 2000s. The creation of a Local Historic District would provide zoning that would curb demolitions and out of scale remodels, however there is no current protection in place. In 2013, a non-profit group called Yalecrest (Keep Educating and Encouraging Preservation) was formed to work with residents in addressing the demolitions and out of character remodels that are destroying the historic nature of Yalecrest.

References

External links 

 Yalecrest Historic District

Neighborhoods in Salt Lake City
Historic districts on the National Register of Historic Places in Utah
National Register of Historic Places in Salt Lake City